Nicolae Mămăligă (born in Chişinău, 1888) was a Bessarabian politician.

Biography
He served as Member of the Moldovan Parliament (1917–1918).

Bibliography
Gheorghe E. Cojocaru, Sfatul Țării: itinerar, Civitas, Chişinău, 1998, 
Mihai Taşcă, Sfatul Țării şi actualele autorităţi locale, "Timpul de dimineaţă", no. 114 (849), June 27, 2008 (page 16)

Notes

Moldovan MPs 1917–1918
1888 births
Politicians from Chișinău
Year of death missing